Absolutely is a greatest hits album by English pop band ABC, released in 1990. It includes most of the band's singles, from 1981 until the album's release. A video package featuring their promos was also released. A new remix of "The Look of Love" was released to promote the album, but not with approval of the band.

Track listing

Charts and certifications

Weekly charts

Certifications

References

External links

ABC (band) albums
1990 compilation albums